Earl Arthur Bellamy (March 11, 1917 – November 30, 2003) was an American television and film director.

Biography
Bellamy was born in Minneapolis, Minnesota. He was also known as Earl J. Bellamy, or Earl J. Bellamy, Jr.  His father was Richard James Bellamy. He moved to Hollywood in 1920 with his parents; his father was a railroad engineer. After graduating from Hollywood High School in 1935, Bellamy received a degree from Los Angeles City College and took a job as a messenger for Columbia Studios. Within four years, Bellamy had worked his way up to second assistant director before taking time off to serve in the U.S. Navy's photographic unit during World War II.

When Bellamy returned to Hollywood, he became a well-respected TV director who was particularly adept at Westerns. Although he directed nearly two dozen feature films, Bellamy was best known for his work on The Lone Ranger, Sergeant Preston of the Yukon, Rawhide, The Adventures of Rin Tin Tin, The Virginian and Tales of Wells Fargo.

Family fare was his forte in the 1950s. He directed shows like Jungle Jim, Lassie, Leave It to Beaver and The Donna Reed Show. In the 1960s, he focused on sitcoms like Bachelor Father, Get Smart, The Munsters,  McHale's Navy, and the final season of My Three Sons. Medical dramas, like Marcus Welby, M.D. and Trapper John M.D., as well as sitcoms such as M*A*S*H and The San Pedro Beach Bums, kept him busy in the 1970s. Before retiring in 1986, Bellamy directed the science fiction miniseries, V, and many episodes of Fantasy Island and Hart to Hart.

After his retirement, Bellamy and his wife moved to New Mexico.  The state had provided him with many different filming locations.

In 2002, the Motion Picture and Television Fund gave him the prestigious Golden Boot Award.

Bellamy died on November 30, 2003, in Albuquerque, New Mexico, at the age of 86. It is reported that he died of a myocardial infarction (heart attack).

He had three children, Michael, Earl Jr, and Karen. His first wife died 9 years after Earl Jr was born. His second wife (mother of Karen) committed suicide.

Films
Sidewinder 1 (1977) director
Speedtrap (1977) director
Against a Crooked Sky (1975) director
Walking Tall Part 2 (1975) director
Sidecar Racers (1975) director
Seven Alone (1974) director
Backtrack! (1969) director
Incident at Phantom Hill (1966) director 
Munster, Go Home! (1966) director
Gunpoint (1966) director 
Fluffy (1965) director
Stagecoach to Dancers' Rock (1962) director
Toughest Gun in Tombstone (1958) director
Blackjack Ketchum, Desperado (1956) director
Seminole Uprising (1955) director 
It Should Happen to You (1954) assistant director
From Here to Eternity (1953) assistant director
Shockproof (1949) assistant director

Television
Alfred Hitchcock Presents Role: Director
The Andy Griffith Show Role: Director
Bachelor Father Role: Director
The Brian Keith Show Role: Director of some episodes
CHiPs Role: Director
Castaways on Gilligan's Island (TV movie) Role: Director
Code Red Role: Director
Crusader  Role: Director
Daniel Boone Role: Director
Desilu Playhouse Role: Director
The Desperate Mission (TV movie) Role: Director
Desperate Women (TV movie) Role: Director
Eight Is Enough, season 3, episode 17: "Mother's Rule", Role: Director
The F.B.I. Role: Director
Fantasy Island Role: Director
Fire! (TV movie) Role: Director
Flood! (TV movie) Role: Director
Future Cop Role: Director
Get Smart Role: Director
Hart to Hart Role: Director, Writer
I Spy Role: Director
Isis Role: Director
The John Forsythe Show Role: Director
Knight in Shining Armour (TV special) Role: Director
Laramie Role: Director
Laredo Role: Director
Leave It to Beaver Role: Director
The Lone Ranger Role: Director
M Squad Role: Director
M*A*S*H Role: Director
Masquerade Role: Director
Matt Helm Role: Director
McHale's Navy Role: Director
Medical Center Role: Director
The Mod Squad Role: Director
The Munsters Role: Director
My Three Sons Role: Director
O'Connor's Ocean (TV special) Role: Director
Partners (TV series) Role: Director
Perry Mason Role: Director
The Pigeon (TV movie) Role: Director
The Quest Role: Director
Rawhide Role: Director
The Restless Gun Role: Director of some episodes
S.W.A.T. Role: Director
The San Pedro Beach Bums Role: Director
Sixth Sense (TV series) Role: Director
Starsky and Hutch Role: Director
Stranded (TV special) Role: Director
To Rome with Love Role: Director
The Trackers (TV movie) Role: Director
Trapper John, M.D. Role: Director
U.S. Marshal Role: Director 2 episodes
Valentine Magic on Love Island (TV movie) Role: Director
Wagon Train Role: Director
Young Dan'l Boone Role: Director
Tales of Wells Fargo Role: Director

References

External links

  
 
 Earl Bellamy Papers at the Wisconsin Center for Film and Theater Research
 
 Filmography by New York Times

1917 births
2003 deaths
American television directors
Film producers from California
Artists from Minneapolis
People from Hollywood, Los Angeles
Artists from Albuquerque, New Mexico
Los Angeles City College alumni
United States Navy personnel of World War II
United States Navy sailors
Film directors from Minnesota
Film directors from Los Angeles
Film directors from New Mexico
Film producers from Minnesota